Black, White, and Jewish: Autobiography of a Shifting Self is a 2002 autobiography by the American feminist writer Rebecca Walker.

About
Born in Jackson, Mississippi in 1969, Rebecca Walker is the daughter of the African-American womanist writer Alice Walker and the Jewish-American civil rights lawyer Melvyn R. Leventhal. Her Jewish father is white and her Black mother was raised Christian. In the book, Walker explores her early years living in Mississippi as the child of parents who were active in the later years of the Civil Rights Movement. Walker also touches on living with two parents with very active careers, which she believes led to their separation. She discusses encountering racism and the difficulties of being mixed-race in a society with rigid cultural barriers. Walker also discusses embracing her sexuality and identity as a bisexual Black Jewish woman.

See also
African-American Jews

References

External links
Black, White, and Jewish on Rebecca Walker's website
Author and Producer Rebecca Walker Hosted by Muhlenberg, Muhlenberg College

2001 non-fiction books
African-American feminism
African American–Jewish relations
American autobiographies
Bisexual non-fiction books
Black feminist books
Jewish feminism
Jewish literature
Jews and Judaism in the United States
LGBT African-American culture
LGBT feminism
Literature by African-American women
Multiracial affairs in the United States
Non-fiction books about racism
Works about LGBT and Judaism
Works about White Americans
LGBT autobiographies
2000s LGBT literature
African-American Judaism